United Nations Security Council Resolution 170, adopted unanimously on December 14, 1961, examined the application of Tanganyika for membership in the United Nations. The Council recommended to the General Assembly that Tanganyika be admitted.

See also
List of United Nations Security Council Resolutions 101 to 200 (1953–1965)

References
Text of the Resolution at undocs.org

External links
 

 0170
History of Tanganyika
Politics of Tanganyika
 0170
 0170
1961 in Tanganyika
December 1961 events